The 2016 WK League was the eighth season of the WK League, South Korea's top level women's football league. The regular season began on 14 March 2016 and ended on 17 October 2016. Incheon Hyundai Steel Red Angels won their fourth title in a row by beating Icheon Daekyo in the Championship Final.

Teams

Table

Results

Matches 1 to 14

Matches 15 to 28

Play-offs
The semi-final was played as a single-elimination match, and the Championship Final over two legs.

Semi-final

Championship  Final
First leg

Second leg

Incheon Hyundai Steel Red Angels won 4–0 on aggregate.

References

External links
WK League official website 
Season on soccerway.com

2009
Women
South Korea
South Korea